John Lewis Cash (born August 5, 1934) is a former American football player who played for Denver Broncos of the American Football League (AFL).

References

1934 births
Living people
American football defensive ends
Denver Broncos (AFL) players
Allen Yellow Jackets football players